The Medical Society of London is one of the oldest surviving medical societies (being organisations of voluntary association, rather than regulation or training) in the United Kingdom.

It was founded in 1773 by the Quaker physician and philanthropist Dr John Coakley Lettsome for physicians, surgeons and apothecaries who met to exchange medical news and confer about difficult cases.  Lettsome himself served as president of the new society in 1775–1776, 1784–1785, 1809–1811 and 1813–1815. James Sims was president from 1786 to 1808 and during his long term of office some members of the society, led by Sir William Saunders, became so offended by his autocratic style that in 1805 they formed themselves into a new medical society, the Medical and Chirurgical Society of London, which later evolved into the Royal Society of Medicine.

The Society's wide appeal, the possession of a valuable library (originally purchased from Sims) and freehold property (donated by Lettsome) has helped to ensure the society's success and longevity. Originally based in the City of London, it moved in 1873 to its present location in Lettsom House, Chandos Street, near Cavendish Square in the heart of London's medical community.  This early 19th-century building was originally owned by the Earl of Gainsborough, and is now also home to several related societies who share the facilities. The library has since been purchased by the Wellcome Trust.

The Lettsomian lecture is delivered annually by a fellow of the society.

The Fothergill gold medal, named in honour of physician John Fothergill, Lettsome's patron, is awarded every three years in consultation with the Royal College of Physicians (to be awarded every five years from 2010). The present prize, founded in 1824, is funded by the will of Anthony Fothergill and prior to 1888 was awarded annually. The original award, sponsored by Lettsome, was introduced in 1787 and awarded until 1803.

Fothergill gold medal winners
Source: Source (1787–1902):

Presidents

After the somewhat autocratic 22-year presidency of James Sims a motion was passed in 1805 that :"'No gentlemen be eligible to the office of President or Vice-president
for more than two years in succession." The Presidents are listed below with their year of election to the position.

Source (1773–1902):

References

External links 
 Medical Society of London - website

Medical associations based in the United Kingdom
Organizations established in 1773
Professional associations based in the United Kingdom
1773 establishments in England